Whorlton is a small village in County Durham, in England. It is situated near the River Tees and to the east of Barnard Castle.

Whorlton Bridge is a 183 ft long suspension bridge which crosses the River Tees. It is Britain's 2nd oldest suspension bridge relying on original chainwork after the union bridge over the River Tweed.

The village has a public house called 'The Bridge Inn'.

Arthur Headlam and James Wycliffe Headlam were both born in the village.

History
In October 1829, Whorlton Bridge, then under construction, was destroyed when the River Tees flooded. John Green of Newcastle upon Tyne was called upon to design a replacement. He based the Whorlton Bridge on the Scotswood Bridge, which he had designed earlier. Construction began in 1830, and the bridge was opened in July 1831.

References

External links

Villages in County Durham